Junction is an unincorporated community in western Auglaize Township, Paulding County, Ohio, United States.  It lies along the concurrent State Routes 111 and 637.  The Auglaize River flows along the eastern edge of the community.  It is located midway between the village of Paulding, the county seat of Paulding County, and the city of Defiance, the county seat of Defiance County.

History
Junction was so-named because it was the junction between the Wabash and Erie Canal and Miami and Erie Canal.  With the construction of the railroad, business activity shifted to other nearby places, and the town's population dwindled.

References

Unincorporated communities in Paulding County, Ohio
Unincorporated communities in Ohio
Populated places established in the 1830s
1830s establishments in Ohio